Draug is a 2018 Swedish fantasy horror film taking place in the 11th century, at the end of the Viking Age.

Plot
The film follows a royal rescue party to find a missing missionary in Hälsingland, one of the last pockets of pagan worship.

Cast
Thomas Hedengran as Kettil
Elna Karlsson as Nanna
Ralf Beck as Hakon
Nina Filimoshkina as Deja
Urban Bergsten as Gunder
Matti Boustedt as Odd
Oscar Skagerberg as Kol

Production
A sizzle reel was published online in 2016. The film itself was produced independently in Bollnäs, Hälsingland, the same summer.

Awards
The film premiered at the 2018 edition of Screamfest, where it was awarded prizes for best actor (Thomas Hedengran) and best music (Klas Persson).

See also
 :Category:Dark fantasy films

References

External links
  
 

2018 films
2018 horror films
Films set in the Middle Ages
Films set in the Viking Age
Dark fantasy films
Films about undead
Films based on Norse mythology
Films shot in Sweden
2010s Swedish-language films
Folk horror films
Swedish horror films
Swedish independent films
2010s Swedish films